Ruviano is a comune (municipality) in the Province of Caserta in the Italian region Campania, located about  northeast of Naples and about  northeast of Caserta.

Ruviano borders the following municipalities: Alvignano, Amorosi, Caiazzo, Castel Campagnano, Faicchio, Gioia Sannitica, Puglianello.

References

Cities and towns in Campania